Tsentralny District is an administrative subdivision of the city of Minsk, Belarus. Its name means "Central District" due to its position partly in the centre of the city.

Geography
The district is situated in central and north-western area of the city and borders with Savyetski, Partyzanski, Leninsky, Maskowski, and Frunzyenski districts.

Transport
Tsentralny is served by the subway and tram networks. It is also crossed by the beltway "MKAD".

See also
Nemiga (Minsk Metro)

References

External links
 Tsentralny District official website
 Tsentralny District on Minsk website

Districts of Minsk